Oscar Peterson and Harry Edison is a 1974 album by Oscar Peterson, accompanied by Harry "Sweets" Edison.

Track listing 
 "Easy Living" (Ralph Rainger, Leo Robin) – 6:10
 "Days of Wine and Roses" (Henry Mancini, Johnny Mercer) – 4:51
 "Gee Baby, Ain't I Good to You" (Andy Razaf, Don Redman) – 6:03
 "Basie" (Harry "Sweets" Edison, Oscar Peterson) – 7:22
 "Mean to Me" (Fred E. Ahlert, Roy Turk) – 6:32
 "Signify" (Edison, Peterson) – 5:05
 "Willow Weep for Me" (Ann Ronell) – 4:36
 "The Man I Love" (George Gershwin, Ira Gershwin) – 4:33
 "You Go to My Head" (J. Fred Coots, Dizzy Gillespie) – 5:27

Personnel 
 Harry "Sweets" Edison – trumpet
 Oscar Peterson – piano

References 

1974 albums
Oscar Peterson albums
Harry Edison albums
Pablo Records albums
Albums produced by Norman Granz